
The following lists events that happened during 1819 in South Africa.

Events
 The 5th Cape Frontier War ends
 Dutch Reformed Church congregations are founded in Beaufort West and Somerset West

Births
 17 September - Marthinus Wessel Pretorius, the first president of the South African Republic and founder of Pretoria, is born on the farm Pretoriuskloof in the Graaff-Reinet district of the Cape Colony

References
See Years in South Africa for list of References

 
South Africa
Years in South Africa